Pathological demand avoidance (PDA) is a profile of autism spectrum disorder and a proposed sub-type. Characteristics ascribed to the condition include greater refusal to do what is asked of the person, even to activities the person would normally like, due to extreme levels of anxiety and lack of autonomy. Although PDA has its own traits that are separate from autism, they generally meet the diagnostic criteria by having significant differences in social interaction and communication and presenting restricted and repetitive behaviours. Some notable differences in PDA compared to classic autism spectrum disorders are that individuals appear to be more sociable, have better social skills and social understanding, tend to be more interested in people than objects, are more comfortable with pretend play, and tend to be more imaginative. 

PDA is not recognized by either the DSM-5 or the ICD-10.

The term was proposed in 1980 by the UK child psychologist Elizabeth Ann Newson.

Recognition
Pathological demand avoidance is not recognized by the DSM-5 or ICD-10, the two main classification systems for mental disorders. To be recognized, a sufficient amount of consensus and clinical history needs to be present, and as a newly proposed condition, PDA had not met the standard of evidence required at the time of recent revisions. However, DSM-5 also moved from sub-type classification to the use of ‘Autistic Spectrum Disorder’, which allows for the behavioural traits of different profiles to be described.

In 2011, the National Institute for Health and Care Excellence commented on the fact that PDA has been proposed as part of the autism spectrum but did not include further discussion within the guideline. NICE guidance also expects an ‘ASD’ diagnosis be accompanied by a diagnostic assessment, providing a profile of key strengths and difficulties. Demand Avoidance is listed as a ‘sign or symptom of ASD’ (Appendix 3).

Christopher Gillberg wrote a commentary article in 2014 that reviewed recent research and stated, “Experienced clinicians throughout child psychiatry, child neurology and paediatrics testify to its existence and the very major problems encountered when it comes to intervention and treatment.”

Proposed diagnostic criteria
As of 2014 there are no recognized diagnostic criteria. Criteria proposed by Newson include:

Passive early history in the first year, avoiding ordinary demands and missing milestones
Continuing to avoid demands, panic attacks if demands are escalated
Surface sociability, but apparent lack of sense of social identity
Lability of mood and impulsivity
Comfortable in role play and pretending
Language delay, seemingly the result of passivity, often caught up quickly
Obsessive behavior
Neurological signs (awkwardness, similar to autism spectrum disorders)

The underlying cause of this avoidance is said to be a high level of anxiety, usually from expectations of demands being placed on children, which can lead to a feeling of not being in control of a situation. Children with PDA feel threatened when they are not in control of their environment and their actions, which triggers the fight, flight or freeze response.

History
Newson first began to look at PDA as a specific syndrome in the 1980s when certain children referred to the Child Development Clinic at the University of Nottingham appeared to display and share many of the same characteristics. These children had often been referred because they seemed to show many autistic traits, but were not typical in their presentation like those with classical autism or Asperger's syndrome. They had often been labelled as 'atypical autism' or Persistent Development Disorder-Not Otherwise Specified (PDD-NOS). Both of these terms were felt by parents to be unhelpful.

When Newson was made professor of developmental psychology at the University of Nottingham in 1994, she dedicated her inaugural lecture to talking about pathological demand avoidance syndrome.

In 1997, the PDA Society was established in the UK by parents of children with a PDA profile of autism. It became a registered charity in January 2016.

In July 2003, Newson published in Archives of Disease in Childhood for PDA to be recognized as a separate syndrome within the pervasive developmental disorders.

In 2020, an Incorporated Association was established in Australia. 'Pathological Demand Avoidance Australia Inc.' became a registered charity early 2021.

A systematic review published in 2021 by Kildahl et al  found that many of the studies published on PDA had methodological limitations, which restricted conclusions that could be drawn about patterns of behaviours characteristic of PDA. The authors noted that "currently, we still lack adequate information regarding the uniformity of demand avoidant behaviours, across individuals or over time."

Social psychologists Damian Milton and Devon Price have suggested the behavior should not be considered pathological, and contextualize PDA as an example of individual autonomy or self-advocacy.

Bibliography

References

Autism